Helena Fuchsová, née Dziurová (3 June 1965 – 14 March 2021) was a Czech runner who specialized in the 400 and 800 m events. She retired from athletics in 2004.

Competition record

Personal bests
Outdoor
200m 23.29 (Prague 1997)
400m 50.21 (Budapest 1998)
800m 1:58.56 (Sydney 2000)

Indoor
200m 24.06 (Prague 2000)
400m 50.99 (Liévin 1998)
800m 1:58.37 (Liévin 2001)

References

External links
Official site

1965 births
2021 deaths
Czech female sprinters
Czech female middle-distance runners
Czechoslovak female sprinters
Czechoslovak female middle-distance runners
Athletes (track and field) at the 1996 Summer Olympics
Athletes (track and field) at the 2000 Summer Olympics
Olympic athletes of the Czech Republic
People from Tábor
European Athletics Championships medalists
World Athletics Indoor Championships medalists
Olympic female sprinters
Sportspeople from the South Bohemian Region